"Anything but Love" is a song by German recording artist Daniel Schuhmacher, the winner of the sixth season of the television competition Deutschland sucht den Superstar. Written and produced by DSDS judge Dieter Bohlen, it was released as both his coronation song and debut single. Upon its release, it debuted at number-one on the Austrian, German and Swiss Singles Charts and became one of the highest-selling singles of the year. The song was later included on his debut album, The Album (2009).

Chart performance
In Germany, "Anything but Love " debuted at number one on the German Singles Chart with the highest first week single sales in 2009. The song was eventually certified gold by the Bundesverband Musikindustrie (BVMI) and ranked 19th on the German year-end chart. In total, the single sold 270.000 copies.

Formats and track listings

Charts

Weekly charts

Year-end charts

References

External links
  
 

2009 singles
2009 songs
Daniel Schuhmacher songs
Songs written by Dieter Bohlen
Sony Music singles
Song recordings produced by Dieter Bohlen
Number-one singles in Austria
Number-one singles in Germany
Number-one singles in Switzerland